Peter Cadogan (26 January 1921 – 18 November 2007) was an English writer and political activist.

Life
On 26 January 1921, Cadogan was born in Newcastle upon Tyne. For his education, Cadogan attendeded The King's School, Tynemouth during the 1930s. He studied history at King's College, Durham. For his career, Cadogan started out with an insurance company. In 1941, he joined the Royal Air Force Air Sea Rescue and served until 1946. On his demobilisation, he became a member of the Communist Party of Great Britain. He also was a teacher in Northampton and Cambridge following his 1949 marriage.

When Cadogan was ousted from the Communist Party in 1956, he became a member of the Labour Party. While with Labour, Cadogan was part of the first Socialist Labour League (SLL) conference in 1959. After being removed from the Labour Party and SLL that year, Cadogan became an editor for a Trotskyist magazine called International Socialism in 1960. He also wrote for Socialist Worker.

He was national secretary of the anti-nuclear Committee of 100 in the 1960s. He became an advocate of the breakaway state of Biafra during the Nigerian civil war. In 1968 he started the Save Biafra Campaign.

He was chairman of the South Place Ethical Society from 1970 to 1981. He took the controversial decision, on the grounds of freedom of speech, to permit the British National Front (despite his hatred of fascism) and the Paedophile Information Exchange to meet at the society's premises.

He taught the history of ideas in the extramural department of the University of London (later part of Birkbeck College) between 1981 and 1983.

Cadogan was a long-standing member of the Blake Society and served as both its chairman and president.

He wrote a book on direct democracy in 1974 and many pamphlets and articles.  He was a founder of New Consensus/New Dialogue in 1990, co-founder of Values and Vision, 1991, and chairman of the London Alliance for Local Democracy from 1998.

References

1921 births
2007 deaths
Writers from Newcastle upon Tyne
Alumni of King's College, Newcastle
British anti-war activists
English Trotskyists
Writers about direct democracy
Academics of Birkbeck, University of London
Royal Air Force personnel of World War II
People educated at The King's School, Tynemouth
People associated with Conway Hall Ethical Society
People of the Nigerian Civil War